The 2015–16 Trabzonspor season was the club's 41st consecutive season in the Süper Lig.

Squad

Out on loan

Transfers

Summer

In:

Out:

Winter

In:

Out:

Competitions

Süper Lig

Results

League table

Turkish Cup

Group stage

Round of 16

UEFA Europa League

Qualifying rounds

Squad statistics

Appearances and goals

|}

Goal scorers

Disciplinary Record

References

2015-16
Turkish football clubs 2015–16 season
2015–16 UEFA Europa League participants seasons